Épizon is a commune in the Haute-Marne department in north-eastern France. On 28 February 2013, Épizon annexed the neighboring commune of Pautaines-Augeville.

See also

Communes of the Haute-Marne department

References

Communes of Haute-Marne